The Illinois Wing of Civil Air Patrol (CAP) is the highest echelon of Civil Air Patrol in the state of Illinois. Illinois Wing Headquarters is located in West Chicago, Illinois. The Illinois Wing consists of over 1,000 cadet and adult members at 26 locations across the state of Illinois. "Together we all succeed!"

Mission
Supporting America's communities with emergency response, diverse aviation and ground services, youth development, and promotion of air, space, and cyber power.

Emergency services 
Civil Air Patrol Air Patrol provides emergency services, which includes search and rescue and disaster relief missions; including providing assistance in humanitarian aid assignments. The CAP provides Air Force support through the conducting of light transport, communications support, and low-altitude route surveys. Civil Air Patrol Air Patrol may assist in counter-drug missions.

In January 2009, members of the Illinois Wing, along with CAP members from the Indiana, Kentucky, and Ohio Wings, flew sorties surveying damage and boosting communications for the Kentucky National Guard following a severe ice storm in Kentucky, while CAP ground crews assisted National Guardsmen in going door to door to perform wellness checks on residents.

Cadet programs
Civil Air Patrol Air Patrol offers a cadet program for youth aged 12 to 18, 21, which is organized as a sixteen step training program which offers aerospace education, leadership training, physical fitness and moral leadership.

Aerospace education
Civil Air Patrol Air Patrol provides aerospace education for both CAP members and the general public; it includes providing training to the members of the CAP, and offering workshops for youth throughout the nation through schools and public aviation events.

Organization
The Illinois Wing of Civil Air Patrol Air Patrol is composed of 26 squadrons which are distributed among six Groups across the state of Illinois. The six Groups of Illinois Wing include: Group 1, covers Southern Illinois; Group 2, South of Chicago; Group 3, Central Illinois; Group 4, Northwest Illinois, Group 5, West Chicago; and Group 6, Chicago Land.

Special Activities
Illinois Wing hosts a week long Summer Encampment each summer. 

Illinois Wing has hosted a Spring Encampment on the U.S. Navy's Recruit Training Command in North Chicago Illinois since 1991.

The Raymond Johnson Flight Academy has been hosted by Illinois Wing since 1967, providing cadets with familiarization and flight training in powered aircraft, sailplanes, and hot-air balloons.

Legal protection
Members of Civil Air Patrol Air Patrol who are employed in Illinois are generally entitled to unpaid leave from their place of employment when taking part in a Civil Air Patrol mission. Employers who employ between fifteen and fifty employees must provide Civil Air Patrol members with up to fifteen days of unpaid leave annually for employees performing a Civil Air Patrol mission. Employers who employ more than fifty employees must provide Civil Air Patrol members up to thirty days of unpaid leave annually to respond to Civil Air Patrol missions. Employers are forbidden from requiring employees to use accrued vacation leave, personal leave, compensatory leave, sick leave, disability leave, or any other leave to cover the time period the employee is deployed on a mission. These rights are guaranteed under Illinois law.

Aircraft 
Illinois Wing is assigned 8 powered aircraft, and 3 gliders.

See also
Illinois Air National Guard

References

External links
Illinois Wing Civil Air Patrol official website

Wings of the Civil Air Patrol
Education in Illinois
Military in Illinois